William Joel Stone (May 7, 1848April 14, 1918) was a Democratic politician from Missouri who represented his state in the United States House of Representatives from 1885 to 1891, and in the U.S. Senate from 1903 until his death; he also served as the 28th Governor of Missouri from 1893 to 1897.

Biography
Stone was born near Richmond in Madison County, Kentucky, on May 7, 1848, and attended Richmond's public schools as a child; he graduated from the University of Missouri in Columbia in 1867, whereupon he began the study of law.  Admitted to the bar in 1869, he began practice that year in Bedford, Indiana.  Soon he moved back to Columbia, where he was the city attorney for a time in 1870.  Later that year he moved to Nevada, Missouri, and continued his practice, becoming the Vernon County prosecuting attorney from 1873 to 1874 and was a presidential elector for the Democratic ticket in 1876. His son, Kimbrough Stone, was born in 1875.

In 1884 Stone was elected to the House of Representatives, where he served until 1891; he did not seek renomination in 1890.  In his time there he served as the chairman of the Committee on War Claims.  From 1893 to 1897 he served as Missouri's governor, moving to Jefferson City in 1893.  Beginning in 1896 he served as a member of the Democratic National Committee, serving in this capacity until 1904; he was the committee's vice-chairman from 1900 until his departure.  In 1897 Stone moved to St. Louis, where he continued his practice; he returned to Jefferson City in 1903.  In 1902 he was elected to the Senate, being reelected in 1908 and serving until his death.

Stone served as a member of the Senate Foreign Relations Committee, and chaired that important committee from 1913 until his death.  In this capacity, he was involved in disagreements with the Wilson administration concerning European policy before the U.S. entry into World War I.  He was one of the six U.S. Senators who voted against the United States declaration of war against Germany on April 4, 1917 (the other five were Asle J. Gronna, Republican from North Dakota, Robert M. La Follette, Republican from Wisconsin, Harry Lane, Democrat from Oregon, George W. Norris, Republican from Nebraska, and James K. Vardaman, Democrat from Mississippi). He  supported acquisition of the U.S. Virgin Islands.  Stone also served at various times as chairman of the Committee on Additional Accommodations for the Library, the Committee on Revolutionary Claims, the Committee on Corporations Organized in the District of Columbia, and the Committee on Indian Affairs.

Stone died in Washington, D.C., on April 14, 1918; he is buried in Nevada, Missouri.  His seat was filled until the 1918 election by Xenophon P. Wilfley.  Some of Stone's personal and official papers are archived at the State Historical Society of Missouri, where they are open to researchers.

See also 
 List of United States Congress members who died in office (1900–49)

References

Further reading
 - Congressional biography with picture

External links 

 
 William J. Stone, late a senator from Missouri, Memorial addresses delivered in the House of Representatives and Senate frontispiece 1917

1848 births
1918 deaths
People from Madison County, Kentucky
Democratic Party governors of Missouri
University of Missouri alumni
Politicians from Columbia, Missouri
People from Nevada, Missouri
Democratic Party United States senators from Missouri
Democratic Party members of the United States House of Representatives from Missouri
19th-century American politicians
Chairmen of the Senate Committee on Foreign Relations